Racing Club Haïtien is a professional football club based in Port-au-Prince, Haiti. It is one of the most successful clubs in the country's history.

History 
The club has won the most league championships in Haitian club history, 11, winning in 1937-38, 1941, 1946, 1947, 1953-4, 1958, 1962, 1969, 2000, 2002 Clôture and 2009 Clôture. In 1941, it captured the double after winning the league and the Coupe d'Haïti.

They are also one of only two Haitian clubs to have ever won the CONCACAF Champions' Cup, along with Violette AC, winning in 1963.

Honours
 Ligue Haïtienne (14): 1938, 1941, 1946, 1947, 1954, 1958, 1962, 1963, 1966, 1967, 1969, 2000, 2002 C, 2009 C
 Coupe d'Haïti (2): 1941, 1944
 CONCACAF Champions' Cup (1): 1963
 Tournoi Haiti-Jamaique-Etats-Unis (1): 1968

International appearances 
CONCACAF Champions League
1963 – CONCACAF Champion
1967 – First Round (Caribbean) – Group Stage – 5th placed – 2 pts (stage 1 of 3)
1970 – Final Round (Caribbean) – Lost against  Transvaal (stage 3 of 3); unknown results
1975 – Unknown results; Withdrew or disqualified
1978 – First Round (Caribbean) – Lost against  Pele FC 4 – 2 on aggregate (stage 1 of 4)
CFU Club Championship: 1 appearance
2001 – Second Round – Group A – 2nd place – 2 pts

References

External links
Official Facebook

Football clubs in Haiti
Sport in Port-au-Prince
Association football clubs established in 1923
1923 establishments in Haiti
CONCACAF Champions League winning clubs